Rupert Thorne is a fictional character appearing in comic books published by DC Comics. The character is a crime boss and enemy of Batman.

Publication history
Created by Steve Englehart and Walter Simonson, the character first appeared in Detective Comics #469.

Fictional character biography
Thorne is introduced as a corrupt politician involved in organized crime, being blackmailed by Doctor Phosphorus into turning the city against Batman. After Phosphorus is defeated, Thorne persuades his fellow city councilors to declare Batman an outlaw. He attempts to gain complete control of Gotham City by running for Mayor, but fails.

Thorne is one of three criminals (the other two being the Penguin and the Joker) who make a bid at Hugo Strange's secret auction for Batman's secret identity. He kidnaps and tortures Strange to force him to divulge it rather than lose the auction. Strange resists, however, and apparently dies in the process. Even though he has the body disposed of, Thorne is haunted by eerie sounds and visions of Strange.

After failing in his campaign against Batman and spending some time in hiding, he secretly returns to Gotham. He gets the corrupt Hamilton Hill elected as mayor and orders him to fire Police Commissioner James Gordon in favor of Peter Pauling, who is on Thorne's payroll. Thorne finally identifies Bruce Wayne as Batman after acquiring photos of him changing into his costume from reporter Vicki Vale. Thorne then hires Deadshot to kill Wayne. Deadshot is unsuccessful, however, but before Thorne can deal with his enemy, he begins to succumb to Strange's manipulations; the professor is revealed to have faked his death and tormented Thorne with devices designed to simulate ghostly experiences. Thorne becomes paranoid, convinced that Hill and Pauling are plotting against him and trying to drive him insane. He shoots Pauling dead but is eventually apprehended by Batman and brought to justice.

Thorne makes a return appearance in Detective Comics #825 (cover-dated January 2007, released November 2006). This was his first major comics appearance in decades, and his first appearance in the Post-Crisis DC Universe. He is shown incarcerated in Blackgate Penitentiary when a vengeful Doctor Phosphorus makes an attempt on his life, one that Batman prevents.

In the pages of Batman: Three Jokers, Rupert Thorne is shown to be incarcerated at Blackgate Penitentiary at the time when Batman goes to visit Joe Chill.

Other versions

Gotham by Gaslight
In the year 1891 of Gotham by Gaslight, a Gotham City Council member named Thorne is selected as the new Mayor of Gotham City following the death of Mayor Tolliver.

Justice League: Gods and Monsters
In the comic prequel Justice League: Gods and Monsters, Rupert Thorne appears when mobster Lew Moxon attends a meeting of the other crime lords in Gotham. During the meeting, it is revealed that Thorne and Moxon have been friends since childhood and that they started their criminal careers together. Moxon reveals that he knows Thorne betrayed him by stealing money from his prostitution business and, following an unwritten code of conduct, Thorne atones for his crime by taking out his gun and shooting himself.

In other media

Television

 Rupert Thorne appears in Batman: The Animated Series, voiced by John Vernon. This version is essentially a composite character, integrating elements of other gangsters from the Batman mythos such as Carmine Falcone and Sal Maroni, including his status as Gotham's most powerful crime boss and role in the creation of Two-Face. His most prominent appearances are in the episodes "It's Never Too Late", where Thorne competes with aging crime boss Arnold Stromwell for control over the city's rackets and tries to kill him, resulting in Stromwell deciding to redeem himself by surrendering to the police; "Two-Face, Part I", where Thorne's plan to blackmail District Attorney Harvey Dent ends with Dent being scarred in an explosion at his chemical plant, turning him into Two-Face; "Two-Face, Part II", where Two-Face and his gang start attacking Thorne's rackets and then try to kill him before Batman intervenes; "The Man Who Killed Batman", where Batman is seemingly killed by a small-timer named Sidney Debris, whom Batman saves when Thorne tries to murder him; and "Bane", where Thorne hires the mercenary Bane to kill Batman, only for the Dark Knight to defeat Bane and reveal his plan to usurp Thorne's empire with help from his treacherous moll Candice. Despite numerous arrests after confrontations with Batman and Gotham City's police, Thorne is always able to avoid imprisonment through bribing Gotham's many corrupt politicians, allowing him to remain Batman's enemy throughout the series' run. He makes minor appearances in "Paging the Crime Doctor", introducing his brother Matthew, a de-certified doctor who is forced to make a living performing surgery on his brother's thugs; "Vendetta", in which he is briefly suspected of kidnapping small-time criminal "Spider" Conway before Killer Croc is revealed as the true culprit; "Shadow of the Bat, Part I", in which he is part of corrupt GCPD Deputy Commissioner Gil Mason's plot to frame Gordon; and "Second Chance", in which Robin questions him about Two-Face's apparent kidnapping.
 The 2004 animated series The Batman briefly featured Thorne (voiced by Victor Brandt) in its pilot episode, "The Bat in the Belfry". Implicitly one of Gotham's last old-school crime bosses, he is quickly apprehended by Batman, leaving Gotham's underworld open for claiming by Batman's traditional rogues gallery. He makes several cameos in subsequent episodes, such as "A Matter of Family" and "Rumors" (where he is shown to be one of the titular supervillain's captives).

Film
 Rupert Thorne was originally meant to appear as a major antagonist in the 1989 film, Batman. In an early script written by Tom Mankiewicz, Thorne was depicted as being responsible for hiring Joe Chill to murder Thomas Wayne (who would be running against Thorne for city council). Ultimately, he was replaced by the original character Carl Grissom (played by Jack Palance), who was modeled on Carmine Falcone.
 Rupert Thorne's most major appearance in the DC animated universe is in the film Batman: Mystery of the Batwoman, with John Vernon reprising his role. He works with the Penguin and professional enforcer Carlton Duquesne to finance an illegal arms deal with the President of the fictional nation of Kasnia. The three are also allied with Bane (although there is no mention of Bane's previous treacherous actions against Thorne). Of the three Batwomen, Thorne shares a personal history with rogue cop Sonia Alcana, whose life he ruined when he ordered her parents' shop burned down for refusing to pay protection money when Sonia was still a child. Thorne had escaped punishment due to lack of evidence, although everyone knew he was the one behind it. In the end, Thorne is proven guilty for his role in the arms deal.

Video games
 Rupert Thorne appears in the video game The Adventures of Batman & Robin for the Sega CD, voiced by John Vernon. Clayface takes on Thorne's shape while the real Thorne is on vacation, using the gangster's money to hire other supervillains in a plot to eliminate Batman and Robin.

Miscellaneous
 Rupert Thorne plays a larger role in The Batman Strikes!, a comic book that takes place in the continuity of The Batman. In one issue, he works with Metropolis-based crime boss Bruno Mannheim to create an army of super-villains based on Bane, Man-Bat, and Firefly in the belief that they would be more than a match for any superhero. Thorne, Mannheim, and their creations are defeated by Batman and Superman.

See also
 List of Batman Family enemies

References

Fictional gangsters
Fictional politicians
Comics characters introduced in 1977
DC Comics supervillains
Fictional crime bosses
Fictional business executives
Characters created by Steve Englehart